Indian Institute of Technology Tirupati (IIT Tirupati) is an autonomous engineering and technology education institute located in Tirupati, Andhra Pradesh. Initially mentored by IIT Madras, now IIT Tirupati, the fastest growing 3rd generation IIT is located in Yerpedu, Tirupati, and has a size of 539 acres, including a proposed research park. The Foundation stone for IIT Tirupati was laid by the Union Minister Smriti Irani and the then Union Minister and former Vice President of India  M.Venkaiah Naidu and the then chief minister of Andhra Pradesh N. Chandrababu Naidu.

The Director of IIT Madras, Dr. Bhaskar Ramamurthi was the Mentor Director of IITT since 2016. In 2017, K.N. Satyanarayana was appointed as director for IIT Tirupati. He was re-elected as the director for a second term since 2022. 

The institute is planning to construct an 18 acres research park in the campus, which will soon be the largest institute research park in India, overtaking the IIT Madras research park which has a size of 13 acres.   

Tirupati is the only city in India to have an IIT (IIT Tirupati), IISER (Indian Institute of Science Education and Research, Tirupati) and an IIIT (Indian Institute of Information Technology, Sri City), all in 1 city.

Campus 

The college started functioning from 5 August 2015 in a temporary campus housed at Krishna Theja Educational Institutions in Chadalawada Nagar. IIT Tirupati was initially functioned out of the campus of Chadalawada Group of Institutes in Tirupati, while the permanent building is coming up near Yerpedu located between Renigunta and Srikalahasti. The hostel facility for boys and girls is ready at the Transit Campus (50 acres), Yerpedu, which is a part of the permanent campus, and is also known as the South Campus. The permanent campus is under construction and the transit campus has been already constructed which consists of the Classroom Complex, Hostel block, Open Air Theatre, Computer Labs, Engineering Workshops for all trades, Library, a 500 seater mess, Play Ground, Indoor stadium and a health center. 

The campus also has a grocery store, a 24/7 cafeteria and a new combined Mess-Canteen building in the North campus.   

Currently, the Stage 1C project of the campus construction is on the verge of completion, in the North campus. In this stage, the buildings constructed in the academic zone include two department buildings with offices for about 100 faculty members and about 50 laboratories, a Central Instrumentation Facility (CIF), a lecture hall complex (LHC) and an Administrative building. In the hostel zone, two hostels with 500 rooms each, a central dining facility, and sports facilities are ready. The residential zone includes the Director's bungalow that has already been occupied,168 apartments for faculty and staff, and a 20-room guest house. Two lakes spanning over 10 acres of land have been created on the campus to store water. In recognition of the sustainable construction, health and safety practices adopted at the site, the construction projects have received several awards, including the GRIHA Council Award for an exemplary demonstration of Sustainable Building Materials/Technologies, HUDCO Award for sustainable construction, International Safety Award Merit 2021 from the British Safety Council, RoSPA Gold Award 2020 from the Royal Society for the Prevention of Accidents, and the Trophy and Scroll for the category Construction Health, Safety & Environment presented at the 12th CIDC Viswakarma Awards, 2021.

Academics
IIT Tirupati offers a 4-year Bachelor of Technology (B.Tech)  along with 2-years Master of Science (M. Sc) Master of Science (M.S.), Master of Technology (M.Tech - started in 2018), Master of Public Policy (MPP) & Doctor of Philosophy (Ph.D.) programmes in several engineering, science and humanities fields . The academics of IIT Tirupati have been divided in two parts i.e. curriculum and courses. Admission to the B.Tech programme is through the Indian Institute of Technology Joint Entrance Examination (IIT-JEE-Advanced) and students are admitted after completing 10+2 schooling. Admission to the M.Tech/MSc/Ph.D programmes is through Graduate Aptitude Test in Engineering (GATE) - for M.Tech/Ph.D , Joint Admission Test for MSc (JAM). 

The institute also has a strong collaboration with IISER, Tirupati, to activity conduct and promote research. They have collaborated and started CAMOST (Center for Atomic, Molecular, and Optical Sciences & Technologies)  to promote activities. The students at IIT Tirupati can also take courses at IISER Tirupati and transfer credits during their undergraduate coursework.  
The institute offers BTech courses in 5 departments, namely; .

 Chemical Engineering
 Civil Engineering
 Computer Science and Engineering
 Electrical Engineering
 Mechanical Engineering
The institute is now planning to start at School of Design and a Materials Science department very soon. The masterplan for the campus is to accommodate 12,000 students by 2040, and the college is currently in the Phase 2 of the construction process where they are building 3 separate Department Blocks, a Central Instrumentation Facility, the Administrative main block, 2 artificial lakes, a mess and a library.   

The Institute commenced its operations with a total of 106 students in four B.Tech. programmes (Civil, Computer Science & Engineering, Electrical & Mechanical) in 2015. M.Tech programs in Computer Science, Electrical and Mechanical Engineering, and B.Tech in Chemical Engineering were launched in 2018. Gradually, the Institute expanded its strength and introduced a master's programme in Mathematics and Statistics and M. Tech in three streams of Civil Engineering in 2019. The Master's programmes in Chemistry and Physics were launched in 2020. The current student strength of about 1250 includes 823 B. Tech students, 134 M. Tech students, 84 M. Sc students, 41 MS and 168 PhD research students. It has been often pointed out that IITs have a skewed gender ratio. However, IIT Tirupati boasts of 21.87% of girl students admitted to the B. Tech programmes and overall of 20.5% girl students enrolled in various programmes at the Institute. Catering to the needs of economically marginal groups, the Institute offers scholarships for students hailing from low-income families. With the objective of working closely with the Indian armed forces, the Indian army has sponsored nine officers for the M.Tech programs in Electrical and Mechanical Engineering in 2020.

Infrastructure Development 
The Institute started its operations in 2015 from a temporary campus on the Tirupati Renigunta Road. The Government of Andhra Pradesh has provided a picturesque 548 acres of land for the development of the permanent campus for the Institute.  The campus is being developed in multiple stages. A master plan has been prepared to build a campus to cater to 12,000 students while conserving its ecological features. IIT Tirupati set a goal that the first batch should live at least one year in the permanent campus and achieved the target. The Stage 1A campus consisting of laboratories, hostels, classrooms and sports facilities was completed by 2018 by using prefab and sustainable technologies.  Subsequently, the Stage 1B project consisting of a hostel building, a classroom complex building and an engineering unit building were completed by the end of 2019. Currently, the Stage 1C project is under construction. In the academic zone, the buildings under construction include two Department Buildings that will have offices for about 100 faculty members and the associated laboratories, a Central Instrumentation Facility, a Lecture Hall Complex and Administrative Building. In the hostel zone, two hostels with 1,000 rooms, a Central Dining facility and sports facilities are under construction. In the residential zone, 168 apartments for faculty and staff, a 20 room guest house and Director's Bungalow are under construction. The external services for power, water, wastewater handling and roads are also under construction as part of this package. Two lakes over 10 acres are being created to store water. The architects for the project include M/s Suresh Goel and Associates, Delhi and M/s ADPL, Delhi. The construction projects are being implemented through CPWD. The contractor for the Stage 1C project is M/s JMC Projects Ltd. The Third-Party Quality Assurance is being provided by CUBE, IIT Madras. In spite of the challenges posed by the Covid-19 pandemic, the project team has been able to make significant progress. The contract for the Stage 1C project was awarded on 20 March, 2020. However, due to the nationwide lockdown, the contractor M/s JMC Projects was able to start mobilisation only after Unlock 1.0 was announced during the first week of June 2020. Viswakarma Awas, the workers' colony set up by the JMC Projects on a six acres plot in the campus is a model construction workers colony consisting of housing, RO water supply, STP for sewerage treatment, medical centre, children's school and gardens. The project has so far achieved over 5 million safe manhours. In recognition of the sustainable construction, health and safety practices adopted at the site, the projects have received many awards including the GRIHA Council Award for exemplary demonstration of Sustainable Building Materials/Technologies, HUDCO Award for sustainable construction, International Safety Award Merit 2021 from British Safety Council, RoSPA Gold Award 2020 from the Royal Society for the Prevention of Accidents, England, and the Trophy and Scroll for the category Construction Health, Safety & thEnvironment presented at the 12 CIDC Viswakarma Awards 2021. In the first year of operation in 2019, the campus was ranked sixth amongst the cleanest Higher Educational Institutions in the category of Residential Universities for the Swachh Campus Award. The complete project team of the Institute Engineering team, Architects, CPWD and Contractor have been working tirelessly to create a world class campus to be benchmarked by other Institutions.

Student Co-curricular and Extra-Curricular Activities 
Apart from their academic rigour, students at the Institute are active in the overall development of their personalities. Students engage with their peers in social service, club activities, cultural programmes, an annual festival, etc. Some of them include:

Tirutsava: Techno-cultural Fest 
Tirutsava, the annual techno-cultural festival of IIT Tirupati organised by the students in February each year, is witness to a motley of cultural and technical events. Coding challenges, think tanks, debates, quizzes, and cultural activities give the students a chance to identify their creative and analytic sides. It also includes standup comedy, skits, dramas etc.

SPIC MACAY 
SPIC MACAY chapter at IIT Tirupati has been very active, with the aim to promote Indian classical music and dance among the youth. In August 2019 IIT Tirupati hosted the Virasat series consisting of a number of art workshops and music performances by renowned artists.

Clubs and Sports Activities 
IIT Tirupati has about 14 active clubs and societies under which they organise various extramural activities, like Techmaniacs (Robotics), Digital Wizards (Coding), Chaturanga (Chess), Xcite (Dance) etc. With the increasing number of students, club activities became more diversified. Various clubs play a crucial role in getting the participants ready for Inter-IIT cultural, technical and sports events. Under the Fit India Movement, the Institute launched its Fitness Club to organise yoga classes and informative webinars on the theme of the club. Sarathi, the Guidance and Counseling Unit is catered to the mental well-being of students by conducting counselling sessions, orientation programmes, yoga classes and life-skill sessions.

Departments

Department of Chemical Engineering 
The Department of Chemical Engineering, instituted in 2018, offers both undergraduate and postgraduate programmes. The undergraduate curriculum attempts to achieve a balance between fundamental courses and industry-oriented design courses. This helps students to appreciate each course's relevance and relate its concepts to application in the process industry. At the postgraduate level, the department currently offers MS (by research) and Ph.D. programmes. The faculty members in the department are actively engaged in various research areas such as Food Technology, Colloids and Interfaces, Nanomaterials, Advanced Separations, Catalysis, Microfluidics and Corrosion Engineering and Machine Learning for Process Systems.

Department of Civil and Environmental Engineering 
The Department of Civil and Environmental Engineering is one of the first four departments that were set up in 2015 with the Institute. The department offers numerous courses at the undergraduate level to introduce students to academic research and themes relevant to the civil engineering industry. Most of the courses are structured in a problem-solving or a design-based approach, which are currently the industry's key demands. Undergraduate research is encouraged by the Institute by providing B.Tech. students the option of working on research projects with their faculty as a part of their curriculum. In addition to M.S. and Ph.D programmes, the department offers M. Tech programme in specialisations such as environmental & water resources engineering, structural engineering, and transportation and infrastructure engineering. M.Tech. in geotechnical engineering commenced from August 2020 along with Dual Degree programmes in the aforementioned streams.

Department of Computer Science 
The Department of Computer Science and Engineering at IIT Tirupati, established in 2015, offers B. Tech., M.Tech., M.S., and Ph.D. The undergraduate degree offered by the department gives ample importance to fundamentals and state-of-the-art technologies by offering courses such as Machine Learning, Deep Learning, Artificial Intelligence, etc. The faculty members of the department, whose interests cover a wide range of fields in Computer Science (broadly in the verticals of Systems, Theory and Data Science), constantly work towards providing better education while working at premier levels in their respective fields like Algorithmic Engineering, Big Data Technologies, Cloud Computing, Delay Tolerant Networks, Internet of Things, Machine Learning, Software Engineering, etc. Courses in the curriculum cover basics and advanced levels and have been planned to nurture innovation, ethics, and societal interaction. Each programme follows a rigorous and diversified course curriculum emphasising fundamentals, project-driven, and industry-relevant courses. The M.Tech. programme in CSE focuses on Data Science and Systems. The department is actively engaged in research in the areas of algorithms, machine learning, reinforcement learning, computer networks, software engineering, parallel computing, computer organisation and architecture, theoretical computer science, and mathematical modelling.

Department of Electrical Engineering 
The Department of Electrical Engineering at IIT Tirupati, established in 2015, offers B. Tech., M. Tech., M.S. and Ph.D. programmes. The department is actively involved in research in the areas of signal processing, machine learning, medical imaging, nanoelectronics, device modelling, semiconductor devices, digital design and cyber security, power electronics, power systems and smart grids, industrial automation, robust & optimal control, electronic instrumentation, physical layer secrecy, performance analysis of networked systems and distributed algorithms on networks. The department offers a two-year M.Tech. programme in signal processing & communication. The programme consists of theoretical courses in advanced topics in signal processing and communication along with practical laboratory sessions. The department has a well-equipped signal processing and communication laboratory.

Department of Mechanical Engineering 
The Department of Mechanical Engineering, established in 2015, offers B.Tech., M.Tech. (in Design and Manufacturing), and PhD programmes. The department offers undergraduate courses titled 'Engineering Drawing' and 'Engineering Mechanics' to all the engineering disciplines of IIT Tirupati. The department is active in research in the areas of applied solid mechanics, dynamics, thermal and fluid engineering, materials research, and manufacturing engineering. The faculty members of the department are engaged in research in the areas of solid mechanics and design, thermal and fluid engineering, and manufacturing engineering and materials research. Also, a wide range of advanced courses are offered in line with the current research topics relevant to the department and interdisciplinary research. The department is highly active in organising symposiums, seminars, and workshops to train the faculties and students from the Institute and other institutions, thus promoting research collaboration. The faculty members from the department effectively collaborate with industries, research organisations, and other universities on problems relevant to society and industries.

Department of Mathematics and Statistics 
The Department of Mathematics and Statistics at IIT Tirupati started in 2015. The department offers mathematical, statistical and computing courses for all engineering disciplines of IIT Tirupati at undergraduate, postgraduate and research levels. The department specialises in the areas of pure and applied mathematics, industrial mathematics & statistics, machine learning and data science. The faculty members of the department are engaged in various research areas of mathematics and statistics, including Representation Theory, Analytic Number Theory, Fractals, Fixed Point Theory, Partial Differential Equations, Numerical Analysis, Inverse Problems, Industrial Mathematics, Mathematical Modelling, Generalized Linear Models, Machine Learning, Statistical Signal Processing, Statistical Finance, and Environmental Statistics.  The department currently offers M.Sc. (Mathematics and Statistics) and Ph.D. programmes.

Department of Physics 
The Department of Physics offers courses at the undergraduate and research levels. The curriculum for a PG programme in Physics has been formulated. The faculty members are actively involved in research in the theoretical and experimental aspects of Atomic, Molecular, Optical physics (AMOP) and Condensed Matter Physics (CMP). To facilitate the exchange of ideas and provide additional research exposure to the students, the department hosted 13 invited talks during the academic year 2019-20. Different research and teaching laboratories are being set up in the department with the Institute funding and various external grants. Some of our faculty members are instrumental in conceptualising a joint IIT Tirupati - IISER Tirupati center for Atomic, Molecular and Optical Science and Technologies (CAMOST).

Department of Humanities and Social Sciences 
The Department of Humanities and Social Sciences at IIT Tirupati, established in 2015, offers elective courses in the areas of Economics, English, Philosophy, Finance, and Organisational behaviour for all engineering disciplines in Undergraduate programmes. The department also offers compulsory courses in the area of English and Professional Ethics. In addition, proficiency courses in foreign languages such as Spanish, German, Sanskrit, and Japanese are offered to students in the first year of their B.Tech. programme. The department is active in research areas of social and political philosophy, contemporary Indian thought, development economics, climate change economics, environmental economics, natural resource management, behavioural economics, Indian theories of language and literature, conflict literature, empirical asset pricing, financial engineering and risk management, organisational leadership, sustainable HRM, decent work and work engagement.

International Relations 
The institute, being a 3G IIT has already signed MoUs with various universities in India and abroad. IITT is a partner university in the Shastri Indo-Canadian Institute network, and the Mitacs partner network, which includes various Canadian institutes. The college recently signed an MoU with the Dalhousie University for student and faculty exchange, research collaboration, and other academic purposes. IITT is also a member of the Indo-European Heritage network which also includes various top European universities like KTH Royal Institute of Technology, École centrale de Nantes, University of Geneva etc and a group of other Indian institutes too including IIT Bombay, IIT Kanpur, IIT Delhi etc.

CAMOST (IISER-IIT Tirupati Joint Collaboration) 
Drawing on the strength of faculty expertise at IIT Tirupati and IISER Tirupati, a joint 'Center for Atomic, Molecular, Optical Sciences Technologies (CAMOST)' was established. This was inaugurated on 14 August, 2020 by Dr. Arbinda Mitra, Scientific Secretary in the o/o Principal Scientific Adviser to the Govt. of India. The Centre is envisioned to serve as a nodal hub for several ongoing and upcoming scientific National Missions related to Interdisciplinary Cyber Physical Systems (ICPS), Artificial Intelligence (AI), Quantum Technology Applications (QTA), and the Supercomputing Mission (SCM).

IIT Tirupati Navavishkar I-Hub Foundation 
IITT has been awarded the Technology Innovation Hub (TIH) in Positioning and Precision Technologies under the National Mission on Interdisciplinary Cyber Physical Systems.  The Institute established a Section-8 company IIT Tirupati Navavishkar I-Hub Foundation for implementing the objectives of this mission including Technology Development; HRD & Skill Development; Innovation, Entrepreneurship Collaborations. The TIH will be receiving a funding of Rs. 100 crores over a period of five years.

IDEAS2 -Tinkering and Innovation Hub of IIT Tirupati 
Ideas² is a facility for the students of IIT Tirupati to engage in technical activities, gain hands-on experience and exposure to modern technology. It aims to provide a platform for students to express their ideas and promote creativity and innovation in an informal environment. It is a workspace for students driven by innovation and interaction that provides the required facilities and guidance to convert ideas into reality.

References 

 https://iittp.ac.in/pdfs/annualreport/IIT%20English%202020-2021.pdf

External links

 Official website
 Udaan  (Bi-annual student newsletter)
 Tirutsava (Annual Techno Cultural fest)

Tirupati
Engineering colleges in Andhra Pradesh
Universities and colleges in Tirupati
Educational institutions established in 2015
2015 establishments in Andhra Pradesh